Brigadier general Gürsediin Saikhanbayar is a Mongolian politician, public administration manager and military officer who has been the Minister of Defense of Mongolia since 2020. He is the 36th minister since the establishment of the ministry in 1911 and the 17th since the end of communism in 1990. He holds the rank of Brigadier General, awarded to him in 2016.

Early life and career 
He was born on July 4, 1968, in Ulaanbaatar. He was raised in a military family. His father Gursed was born in Arkhangai province and he taught in primary and secondary schools in Bayankhongor Province before enlisting Mongolian Army in 1961. His father retired from the military as in rank of Lieutenant Colonel and his mother served as an accountant in military units, and she is retired now. Also, G.Saikhanbayar's grandfather was a veteran of the Second World War. In 1975, he enrolled in a 10-year secondary school located in the capital city. From 1985 to 1989, he studied at the Political Science Department of the Military University.

Around the time of the Mongolian Revolution of 1990, he was a Political Deputy in the 121st Unit of the Mongolian People's Army. Up until 1994, he worked as an officer of information and culture in the 318th Unit, after which he served in the Training and Education Department of the General Staff. From 1997 to 2000 Head of the Information, Culture and Education Department of the General Staff. In 2001, he graduated from the PLA National Defence University of the People's Republic of China. From 2005 to 2012, he served as Head of the Public Administration Directorate, Ministry of Defense. After which he enrolled in the Military Academy of the General Staff of the Armed Forces of Russia, where he graduated from in 2014. From July 2014 to 2020, he was the head of the Strategic Policy and Planning Directorate of the Ministry of Defense. During this period, he became linked to the legal reform of the defense sector. He was appointed as a member of the Government of Mongolia on 8 July 2020, becoming Minister of Defense in the cabinet of Prime Minister Ukhnaagiin Khürelsükh by his order. He was reappointed the following year by Luvsannamsrain Oyun-Erdene. He has been the first non-civilian in over a decade to hold this post.

Personal life 
He is married and blessed with two children. Aside from speaking his native language, he is fluent in Russian and he has limited English knowledge.

Awards 

 Honorary Medal of Military Service (1999)
 Order of Military Merit
 Medal of the 800th anniversary of the founding of the Great Mongolia (2006)
 Order of the Red Banner of Military Merit (2015)

References 

Ministers of Defence of Mongolia
1968 births
Living people
People from Ulaanbaatar
Brigadier generals
Mongolian military personnel